VBO may refer to:

 Vainu Bappu Observatory
 Vertex Buffer Object, an OpenGL extension for faster rendering of triangles
 Verbond van Belgische Ondernemingen, the Federation of Belgian Enterprises